Love Come Down: The Best of Evelyn "Champagne" King is a greatest hits album by Evelyn "Champagne" King. It includes the songs "Shame", "I Don't Know If It's Right", "Love Come Down" and "I'm in Love."

Track listing
Side one
 "Shame" – 6:31
 "I Don't Know If It's Right" – 	3:45
 "Music Box" – 3:22
 "I'm in Love" – 5:01
 "Don't Hide Our Love" – 4:10
 "Love Come Down" – 	6:04
 "Betcha She Don't Love You" – 3:57

Side two
"Get Loose" – 4:05
 "Action" – 3:25
 "Shake Down" – 3:52
 "Teenager" – 3:57
 "Just for the Night" – 4:44
 "Give Me One Reason" – 3:56
 "High Horse" – 4:00
 "Your Personal Touch" – 3:58

External links

Evelyn "Champagne" King albums
1993 greatest hits albums
RCA Records compilation albums